Ndinga is a Congolese surname that may refer to:

Alexis Ndinga, Congolese politician
Antoine Ndinga Oba (1941–2005), Congolese diplomat, political figure, and linguist
Delvin Ndinga (born 1988), Congolese footballer
Henri Ndinga (born 1961), Congolese sprinter
Pierre Ndinga (born 1958), Congolese sprinter
Rock Itoua-Ndinga (born 1983), Congolese footballer

Surnames of Congolese origin
Kongo-language surnames